Chhalgari or chalgari is a town and union council of Kachhi District or Bolan District (old name) in the Balochistan province of Pakistan. It is located at an altitude of 82 metres (272 feet).

References 

Populated places in Kachhi District
Union councils of Balochistan, Pakistan